Brad Tapper (born April 28, 1978) is a Canadian former professional ice hockey right winger who played in the National Hockey League (NHL) for the Atlanta Thrashers over parts of three seasons. After retiring from playing, he remained active in hockey as a coach in different professional hockey organisations in the US, Canada, and Germany. He is currently a co-trainer with ERC Ingolstadt in the Deutsche Eishockey Liga (DEL) and was, before that, head coach of the Iserlohn Roosters, also in the DEL. Previously, he worked with the Grand Rapids Griffins of the American Hockey League (AHL), spent a year as the head coach of the Adirondack Thunder in the ECHL, and was an assistant coach with the Rochester Americans (AHL), Chicago Wolves (AHL), Orlando Solar Bears (ECHL), and Florida Everblades (ECHL).

Playing career
As a youth, Tapper played in the 1992 Quebec International Pee-Wee Hockey Tournament with the Toronto Red Wings minor ice hockey team.

Tapper started his career by playing for the RPI Engineers of the ECAC. Through his three years on the team, he managed to work his way up from third on the team in scoring in the 1997–98 season to eventually led the team in points, goals, power-play goals (10), and game-winning goals (7) during the 1999–2000 season. He also shared the team lead with three short-handed goals and ranked third in assists. He also finished that season ranked 15th in NCAA Division I in scoring, and fourth in goals. He also led the nation with seven game-winning goals, and shared 11th with 10 power-play goals.

Following that season, he was signed by the Atlanta Thrashers as a free agent on April 11, 2000. He split his first season between the Thrashers, and their IHL affiliate, the Orlando Solar Bears. He played in two games during Orlando's final run for the Turner Cup. Following the collapse of the IHL, he continued to split his seasons between the Thrashers and their new AHL affiliate, the Chicago Wolves, helping the Wolves to their first Calder Cup victory in 2001 while setting professional career highs with the Thrashers in the 2002–03 season.

However, on January 6, 2004, the Atlanta Thrashers recalled and traded Tapper to the Ottawa Senators for Daniel Corso. The Senators sent him to their AHL affiliate, the Binghamton Senators, and at the end of the season decided not to re-sign him. On July 22, 2004, Tapper signed with the Nurnberg Ice Tigers of the German Deutsche Eishockey Liga and played one season for them and also one season for the Hannover Scorpions.

He was signed by the Philadelphia Flyers on June 26, 2006 to a one-year contract. After playing five games for their AHL affiliate, the Philadelphia Phantoms, Tapper returned to Germany to play another season for Hannover. After playing the next two seasons with the Iserlohn Roosters, he announced his retirement as a player because of a result of two concussion injuries during his career on June 25, 2009.

After his playing career was over, Tapper remained active in hockey as a coach. For the 2009–10 season, he was the head coach of the North York Rangers in the Central Canadian Hockey League, taking them to the postseason, where they lost in the first round to the Burlington Cougars. In the 2010–11 season, Tapper was an assistant coach with the ECHL's Florida Everblades, working under Greg Poss. Again, the first round of the playoffs was the end of the year for his team, as the eventual semifinalists, the Kalamazoo Wings defeated his Everblades 3–1. Tapper remained in Florida for the next year, and saw his team through four rounds of the playoffs, culminating in a Kelly Cup championship over the Las Vegas Wranglers.

Career statistics

Regular season and playoffs

Awards and honours

 2000–2001: Turner Cup Orlando Solar Bears
 2001–2002: Calder Cup Chicago Wolves

References

External links

1978 births
Atlanta Thrashers players
Binghamton Senators players
Canadian expatriate ice hockey players in Germany
Canadian ice hockey coaches
Canadian ice hockey right wingers
Chicago Wolves players
Hannover Scorpions players
Iserlohn Roosters players
Living people
Nürnberg Ice Tigers players
Orlando Solar Bears (IHL) players
Philadelphia Phantoms players
RPI Engineers men's ice hockey players
Rensselaer Polytechnic Institute alumni
Sportspeople from Scarborough, Toronto
Ice hockey people from Toronto
Undrafted National Hockey League players
AHCA Division I men's ice hockey All-Americans